Jeffrey Alan Lamp (born March 9, 1959) is an American former professional basketball player who played six seasons in the National Basketball Association (NBA). Lamp played college basketball for the University of Virginia, where he was an All-American. At a height of 6'6", he played shooting guard and small forward.

High school career
Lamp attended and played competitively at Ballard High School, in Louisville, Kentucky.

College career
Lamp played from 1977 to 1981 for the Virginia Cavaliers. Lamp was an All-ACC selection in each of his four seasons at UVa (1978–81). He finished with 2,317 career points which was a school record until broken by Bryant Stith (2,516) in 1992.  During his time in Charlottesville, Lamp was part of the 1980–81 team that claimed an Atlantic Coast Conference (ACC) regular season title and made the school's first Final Four appearance.

Professional career
Lamp was selected by the Portland Trail Blazers, in the first round (15th pick overall) of the 1981 NBA draft. Lamp played in six NBA seasons, for four different teams (the Blazers, Milwaukee Bucks, San Antonio Spurs, and Los Angeles Lakers).

In his NBA career, Lamp played in 291 games, and he scored a total of 1,495 points. His best year in the NBA came during the 1985–86 season, when he split time with the Bucks and Spurs, appearing in 74 games, and averaging 8.2 points per game.  Lamp won two NBA championships (1987 and 1988 with the Lakers) and participated in three NBA Finals (1987, 1988 and 1989, the latter also with the Lakers)

Lamp currently lives in Los Angeles, and works for the NBAPA.

NBA career statistics

Regular season

|-
| align="left" | 1981–82
| align="left" | Portland
| 54 || 0 || 11.4 || .510 || .000 || .820 || 1.2 || 0.5 || 0.3 || 0.0 || 4.6
|-
| align="left" | 1982–83
| align="left" | Portland
| 59 || 1 || 11.7 || .425 || .167 || .808 || 1.3 || 1.0 || 0.3 || 0.1 || 4.4
|-
| align="left" | 1983–84
| align="left" | Portland
| 64 || 0 || 10.3 || .490 || .154 || .896 || 1.0 || 0.8 || 0.3 || 0.1 || 5.0
|-
| align="left" | 1985–86
| align="left" | Milwaukee
| 44 || 1 || 15.9 || .449 || .231 || .859 || 2.8 || 1.5 || 0.5 || 0.1 || 6.3
|-
| align="left" | 1985–86
| align="left" | San Antonio
| 30 || 1 || 20.7 || .502 || .235 || .812 || 2.6 || 1.8 || 0.6 || 0.0 || 11.1
|-
| style="text-align:left;background:#afe6ba;" | 1987–88†
| align="left" | Los Angeles
| 3 || 0 || 2.3 || .000 || .000 || 1.000 || 0.0 || 0.0 || 0.0 || 0.0 || 0.7
|-
| align="left" | 1988–89
| align="left" | Los Angeles
| 37 || 0 || 4.8 || .391 || .500 || .800 || 0.9 || 0.4 || 0.2 || 0.1 || 1.6
|- class="sortbottom"
| style="text-align:center;" colspan="2"| Career
| 291 || 3 || 11.9 || .470 || .222 || .841 || 1.5 || 0.9 || 0.4 || 0.0 || 5.1
|}

Playoffs

|-
| align="left" | 1982–83
| align="left" | Portland
| 1 || - || 1.0 || .500 || .000 || .000 || 0.0 || 0.0 || 0.0 || 0.0 || 2.0
|-
| align="left" | 1983–84
| align="left" | Portland
| 3 || - || 6.3 || .333 || .000 || .000 || 0.0 || 0.0 || 0.0 || 0.0 || 1.3
|-
| align="left" | 1985–86
| align="left" | San Antonio
| 3 || 0 || 15.0 || .389 || .333 || .000 || 0.3 || 2.3 || 0.3 || 0.0 || 5.0
|-
| align="left" | 1988–89
| align="left" | Los Angeles
| 5 || 0 || 2.8 || .500 || .000 || .500 || 0.6 || 0.2 || 0.0 || 0.0 || 1.4
|- class="sortbottom"
| style="text-align:center;" colspan="2"| Career
| 12 || 0 || 6.6 || .406 || .333 || .500 || 0.3 || 0.7 || 0.1 || 0.0 || 2.3
|}

External links
Jeff Lamp NBA statistics, basketballreference.com

1959 births
Living people
All-American college men's basketball players
American expatriate basketball people in Italy
American expatriate basketball people in Spain
American men's basketball players
Ballard High School (Louisville, Kentucky) alumni
Basketball players from Minneapolis
Basketball players from Louisville, Kentucky
Bàsquet Manresa players
Liga ACB players
Los Angeles Lakers players
McDonald's High School All-Americans
Milwaukee Bucks players
Parade High School All-Americans (boys' basketball)
Portland Trail Blazers draft picks
Portland Trail Blazers players
Reyer Venezia players
San Antonio Spurs players
Shooting guards
Small forwards
Virginia Cavaliers men's basketball players